Julio Amílcar Palacios Lozano (born 18 January 1962) is a retired Salvadoran footballer.

Club career
Palacios has played the majority of his career for Salvadoran giants Alianza.

International career
Palacios Lozano made his debut for El Salvador in an April 1987 Olympic Games qualification match against Panama and has earned a total of 32 caps, scoring 3 goals. He has represented his country in 8 FIFA World Cup qualification matches as well as at the 1993 UNCAF Nations Cup.

His final international was a March 1993 friendly match against Bolivia.

International goals
Scores and results list El Salvador's goal tally first.

References

1962 births
Living people
Association football wingers
Salvadoran footballers
El Salvador international footballers
Alianza F.C. footballers